

Events
 Japanese former Emperor Go-Toba orders the preparation of Shin Kokin Wakashū (also spelled "Shinkokinshu") the eighth Japanese imperial waka poetry anthology.

Births
 Richard de Fournival (died 1260), a Trouvère
 Theobald I of Navarre (died 1253), Count of Champagne, a Trouvère

Deaths
 Shikishi Naishinnō (born unknown), Japanese poet

References

13th-century poetry
Poetry